Jacob Mark "Jake" Pitts (born August 21, 1985) is an American musician and record producer best known as the lead guitarist of rock band Black Veil Brides.

Musical career 
Pitts received his first guitar when he was 10 years old, but he put it away and did not play it again until he was 13. He began listening to Metallica around this time, because he wanted to recreate their sound. Jake only received lessons for about four months. After this time, he decide to learn on his own. From his Mother, Carolyn, he learned music and harmony theory, who was a classical pianist and composer. Pitts is also influenced musically by rock and heavy metal artists such as Van Halen, Scorpions, Paul Gilbert, Buckethead, Randy Rhoads, Pantera, Black Sabbath, Armored Saint, Dio, Manowar, Iced Earth, Darkthrone, Cannibal Corpse, Slayer, Avenged Sevenfold, Mötley Crüe, and Metallica.

Before joining Black Veil Brides, Pitts played lead guitar in the bands the Perfect Victim and 80 Proof Riot.
He is a certified recording engineer and went to Los Angeles Recording School in 2006.
He co-produced the fourth Black Veil Brides record with John Feldmann, along with their fifth record Vale.

He is working on a new band with his spouse Cory, called Aelonia. He is also producing for other bands such as New Years Day.

Personal life 
The song "Carolyn" was written by Pitts about his mother when she was going through a period of illness. On January 18, 2014, his mother, Carolyn, died. He later said that her death scared him and made him start thinking about his health which is why he started working out and eating healthier. Pitts also opened a fitness company called Get Mean Fitness with his friend Matt Yani.

Pitts married Cory Logvin, on February 3, 2017.

Awards 

Kerrang! Awards 2011 – Best International Newcomer
Kerrang! Awards 2012 – Best Single "Rebel Love Song"
Kerrang! Awards 2013 – Best Live Band – Black Veil Brides
Kerrang! Awards 2015 – Best Live Band – Black Veil Brides
Revolver Golden Gods 2011 – Best New Band
Revolver Golden Gods 2012 – Best Guitarist "Jake Pitts"
Revolver Golden Gods 2013 – Song of the Year "In the End"
AP Magazine Guitarists of the Year 2013

Pitts and fellow Black Veil Brides guitarist Jinxx won Revolver Magazine's Golden Gods Award for "Best Guitarists 2012".

Production

 2010 – Black Veil Brides (We Stitch These Wounds) – Songwriter
 2011 – Black Veil Brides (Set the World on Fire) – Songwriter
 2013 – Black Veil Brides (Wretched & Divine) – Songwriter / Engineered guitars
 2014 – Black Veil Brides (Black Veil Brides) – Songwriter / Engineer
 2016 - Thrown Into Exile (Safe Inside) – Producer / Writer / Engineer / Mixing / Mastering
 2017 - AELONIA ("The End" single) – Producer / Writer / Engineer / Mixing / Mastering
 2018 - Black Veil Brides (VALE) – Co-producer / Writer / Engineer
 2019 - Aelonia (We Are One) - Producer, Writer, Mixing / Mastering
 2020 - Black Veil Brides (Re-Stitch These Wounds) – Producer / Songwriter /  Engineer / Mixing / Mastering
 2020 - Black Veil Brides ("Scarlet Cross" Single) - Producer, Writer, Engineer
 2021 - Black Veil Brides (The Phantom Tomorrow) - Producer, Writer, Engineer

References

External links 

Black Veil Brides members
1985 births
Living people
American heavy metal guitarists
American male guitarists